Siobhán Phelan is an Irish lawyer who has been a High Court judge since December 2021. She formerly practised as a barrister and was the chair of the Free Legal Advice Centres.

Early life 
Phelan studied law at Trinity College Dublin. She studied at the Paris 2 Panthéon-Assas University as part of the Erasmus Programme. She completed an LLM degree at the Institute of Comparative Law at McGill University’s Faculty of Law in 1994. Her thesis on the topic of legal aid was supervised by Roderick A. Macdonald.

Legal career 
She was called to the Bar in 1995 and became a senior counsel in 2015. Her practice encompassed judicial review, immigration law, competition law, constitutional law, the law of tort, environmental law, Garda compensation and equality law.

She has acted for the Director of Public Prosecutions. She represented the Green Party in unsuccessful action against RTÉ during the 2016 Irish general election and Green Party TD Patrick Costello's constitutional challenge regarding the Comprehensive Economic and Trade Agreement in 2021. The Health Service Executive appointed her and Conor Dignam to represent the unborn child in PP v. HSE in 2014. She acted for Angela Kerins in her action against the Public Accounts Committee. She advised the Olympic Council of Ireland during the 2016 Summer Olympics ticket scandal. She was one of two writers of an amicus curiae submission to the High Court on behalf of the Irish Human Rights Commission for Marie Fleming's challenge to laws prohibiting assisted suicide.

She was a director of the Free Legal Advice Centres from 1992 and was elected to replace Iseult O'Malley as its chair in 1997. She was a winner of the People of the Year Awards in 2004 for her contribution to FLAC.

Judicial career 
The Irish government agreed to nominate her to become a judge of the High Court in November 2021. She was appointed on 6 December 2021.

References

Living people
High Court judges (Ireland)
Irish women judges
Alumni of Trinity College Dublin
Alumni of the Erasmus Programme
McGill University Faculty of Law alumni
Alumni of King's Inns
21st-century Irish judges
21st-century women judges
Year of birth missing (living people)